The Napoleon snake eel (Ophichthus bonaparti, also known as the Napoleon eel, the Purplebanded snake eel, or the Saddled snake-eel) is an eel in the family Ophichthidae (worm/snake eels). It was described by Johann Jakob Kaup in 1856, originally under the genus Poecilocephalus. It is a marine, tropical eel which is known from the Indo-Pacific, including Durban, South Africa, Mauritius, Indonesia, Japan, Australia, and the Penghu Islands.

The fish is named in honor of biologist Charles Lucien Bonaparte (1803-1857), who supplied the type specimen.

References

External links
 

Taxa named by Johann Jakob Kaup
Fish described in 1856
Ophichthus